James Reipas is an electronica trio from Helsinki, Finland. They combine psychedelic trance with electro and many different genres as well as live instruments. They are also considered one of the earlier suomisaundi-style artists.

Group members are Kolmas Vasemmalta (guitar, vocals), Oskari Olevainen (percussion, vocals), Kayab (keyboards, accordion) and Aki Himanen (trumpet).

Their debut album "This Is Not In Fashion" (DMTCD08) was released on the Australian label Demon Tea Recordings in 2001.They also have one song ("7 Brothers / Themes and Variations") on Exogenic Records compilation "Fusion vs. Confusion" (EXOCD06) and one track ("String Of Pearls") on Demon Tea compilation "Not My Cup Of Tea" (DMTCD07). In December 2005, Finnish Freakdance Records released their second album, "Uwaga". Third album "Personal Trainer" was released in 2008, by Faerie Dragon.

Discography
 This Is Not In Fashion (Demon Tea Recordings 2001)
 Uwaga (Freakdance Records 2005)
 Personal Trainer (Faerie Dragon 2008)
 Super Life (Exogenic Records 2010)

External links
 James Reipas 
 Freakdance Records

Finnish musical groups
Psychedelic trance musicians
Suomisaundi